Alana Kathryn Dillette (born December 2, 1987) is an academic and Olympic swimmer from The Bahamas. 

Dillette swam for the Bahamas at the 2008 Summer Olympics, as well as at the 2007 Pan American Games. She attended and swam for the USA's Auburn University.

At the 2007 Pan American Games she was part of the bronze medal winning women's 4 × 100 m medley relay alongside Alicia Lightbourne, Arianna Vanderpool-Wallace and Nikia Deveaux.

Dillette majored in travel and tourism and as of 2022 is Assistant Professor in the L. Robert Payne School of Hospitality and Tourism Management at San Diego State University. Her research interests include the Black Travel Movement.

See also
Swimming at the 2007 Pan American Games
List of Bahamian records in swimming

References

External links
 
 
 
 

1987 births
Sportspeople from Peterborough, Ontario
Auburn Tigers women's swimmers
Bahamian female swimmers
Bahamian people of Canadian descent
Black Canadian sportspeople
Canadian female medley swimmers
Swimmers at the 2008 Summer Olympics
Olympic swimmers of the Bahamas
Swimmers at the 2006 Commonwealth Games
Commonwealth Games competitors for the Bahamas
Swimmers at the 2003 Pan American Games
Swimmers at the 2007 Pan American Games
Swimmers at the 2011 Pan American Games
Pan American Games bronze medalists for the Bahamas
Living people
Pan American Games medalists in swimming
Competitors at the 2006 Central American and Caribbean Games
Competitors at the 2010 Central American and Caribbean Games
Central American and Caribbean Games silver medalists for the Bahamas
Central American and Caribbean Games bronze medalists for the Bahamas
Central American and Caribbean Games medalists in swimming
Medalists at the 2007 Pan American Games
Black Canadian sportswomen